Energy in Thailand refers to the production, storage, import and export, and use of energy in the Southeast Asian nation of Thailand. Thailand's energy resources are modest and being depleted. The nation imports most of its oil and significant quantities of natural gas and coal. Its energy consumption has grown at an average rate of 3.3% from 2007 to 2017. Energy from renewables has only recently begun to contribute significant energy.

There is some disparity in published figures: according to the Ministry of Energy, the country's primary energy consumption was 75.2 Mtoe (million tonnes of oil equivalent) in 2013. According to BP, primary energy consumption in 2013 was 118.3 Mtoe, rising to 133 Mtoe in 2018.

The energy policy of Thailand is characterized by 1) increasing energy consumption efficiency, 2) increasing domestic energy production, 3) increasing the private sector's role in the energy sector, 4) increasing the role of market mechanisms in setting energy prices. These policies have been consistent since the 1990s, despite various changes in governments.  The pace and form of industry liberalization and privatization has been highly controversial.

Overview
Thailand produces roughly one-third of the oil it consumes. It is the second largest importer of oil in SE Asia. Thailand is a producer of natural gas, with proved, but limited, reserves of at least 0.2 trillion cubic metres . Thailand trails Indonesia and Vietnam in coal production, and the coal it produces is of mediocre quality. It must import coal to meet domestic demand, primarily electricity generation.

Oil

Production: Thailand first began producing oil in 1981, when it started producing 2,000 barrels (84,000 US gallons) per day. By 2013, daily production had increased to 459,000 barrels. Proved oil reserves are estimated at 0.3 thousand million barrels, giving it a reserves-to-production ratio (R/P) of 1.8. meaning that its oil is virtually exhausted. Indications are that Thai oil peaked in 2016 at 486,000 barrels per day.
Consumption: Thailand's consumption in 2018 was 65.8 Mtoe, up 2.2% over the previous year.

Gas

Thailand's proved natural gas reserves amount to 0.2 trillion m3. Its production in 2018 was 37.7 billion m3 (32.4 Mtoe) giving it an R/P ratio of only five years. It consumed 49.9 billion m3, making up the shortfall with 6.2 billion m3 in liquid natural gas (LNG) imports and 7.8 billion m3 via pipeline from Myanmar. 

Natural gas fuels approximately 60–65% of Thailand's electrical power generation. The Erawan gas field in the Gulf of Thailand supplies about 20% of Thailand's gas production. The field is estimated to have a capacity of 885 million cubic feet (c. 25 million m3) per day.

Coal

, Thailand had proved reserves of 1,063 million tonnes of sub-bituminous coal and lignite. In 2018, it produced 3.8 Mtoe, down 8.5% from 2017. It consumed 18.5 Mtoe in 2018, meaning it imported approximately 15 Mtoe. Its reserves-to-production ratio is 72 (years).

Renewables

Thailand's consumption of renewable energy in 2018 was 4 Mtoe, growing at a CAGR of 0.7% for the period 2008–2017. Biomass was the leading contributor of renewable energy, solar second, and wind third. Biofuels contributed 2119 Ktoe in 2018. The government is promoting the production of biodiesel from palm oil to be blended with conventional diesel with the aim of reducing petroleum imports. The production goal is 5.97 million liters per day in 2021. 

In March 2016, the Thai government gave approval for homes and commercial buildings to install solar panels. Each house will be permitted to generate 10 kW and each factory 40 kW. The private sector, despite Thailand's ample solar resources, previously had no right to install power-generation equipment. As of 2021, Thailand is considered as one of the most successful ASEAN countries in promoting and deploying solar energy. The Thai government wants all new cars sold to be electric by the year 2035. Despite progress and ambitious targets, improving renewable energy governance in Thailand is viewed as an important measure to attract more investment in renewable energy sources.

Nuclear

Thailand has no nuclear power plants. Earlier plans to produce five gigawatts of electricity by 2025 using nuclear technology were scaled back to 2 GW in the aftermath of the Fukushima disaster.

As memories of Fukushima recede, interest in nuclear power has revived. Seven ASEAN nations, including Thailand, have signed cooperation agreements with Rosatom, Russia's state nuclear energy agency. EGAT is working with China, Japan, and South Korea on nuclear power generation technology and has sent 100 specialists to train for nuclear power plant projects. EGAT plans for up to five percent of the country's power generation to be generated from nuclear by 2036.

Carbon emissions

In 2018, Thailand emitted 302.4 Mt of CO2, up 0.8% over 2017, but down from its CAGR of 2.4% during the period 2007–2017.

Electricity

Ninety percent of Thai electrical generating capacity is conventional thermal. Oil-fired plants have been replaced by natural gas, which in 2018 generated 65% of Thailand's electricity. Coal-fired plants produce an additional 20%, with the remainder from biomass, hydro, and biogas.  the 
Electricity Generating Authority of Thailand (EGAT) produces 37% of Thailand's electricity; independent power producers, 35%; small power producers, 19%; and electricity imports, 9%.

Energy experts working for the World Wildlife Fund have calculated that Thailand and four Mekong Region neighbours could achieve 100% renewable energy electricity generation by 2050. Their study showed that these countries can produce and use electricity from solar power, wind power, biogas, and small run-of-the-river hydroelectricity. The findings conflict with government plans that discount renewables.

Rising temperatures increase electricity demand. It is estimated that cities the size of Bangkok may require as much as 2 gigawatts of additional electricity for each increase of 1 degree Celsius in temperature due to increased demand for air conditioning.

History of the electricity sector

Anand Panyarachun government 
The government of Anand Panyarachun (1991-1992) began the process of energy industry liberalisation. Its reforms included:
 Allowing private companies, independent power producers (IPPs), to build and operate power generation plants, selling all of their output to the Electricity Generating Authority of Thailand (EGAT)
 Allowing smaller private companies, SPPs or small power producers, to build and operate small power generation plants (mostly co-generation plants), selling a portion of their output to EGAT
 Delegating to the National Energy Policy Organisation (NEPO) the task of developing a master plan for the privatisation of EGAT. Piyasawat Amranand, head of NEPO, designed a plan which would closely replicate the English power pool, break EGAT up into several smaller companies, and privatise the smaller companies.

Chuan Leekpai government 
The subsequent government of Chuan Leekpai (1992-1995, 1997-2001) continued Anand's policies, with Sawit Bhodivihok taking a leading role in industry reform. The reforms were fiercely attacked by members of the EGAT, Metropolitan Electricity Authority (MEA), and Provincial Electricity Authority (PEA) unions.  As a result, no significant changes in industry structure or ownership occurred during Chuan's term.

Thaksin Shinawatra government

Refining and pipelines 
In September 2001, the National Energy Policy Office approved the partial listing of PTT, the state-owned oil and gas company.

PTT swiftly became the largest company by market capitalisation upon listing in the Stock Exchange of Thailand (SET).  PTT greatly profited from the global increase in worldwide oil prices following the 2003 invasion of Iraq, and the rise in its stock price helped propel the SET to a boom.  However, anti-Thaksin critics have claimed that PTT's bull run was due to manipulation by Thaksin.

Electricity generation and transmission 
Like Chuan, Thaksin repeatedly attempted to privatise the Electricity Generating Authority of Thailand (EGAT). One of the goals of the privatisation was to raise 42 billion baht from the IPO and use the funds to invest in three new natural-gas powered power plants.

In early 2004, massive employee protests forced the EGAT governor to resign, thus delaying the planned privatisation of the state enterprise.  Governor Kraisri Karnasuta worked with employees to address their concerns about the privatisation, and by December 2004, it was claimed that approximately 80% of employees supported privatisation. Permanent protest stages and tents at the EGAT headquarters were taken down as the state enterprise returned to normal. After the Mahachon Party (the only party that was officially against privatisation of state enterprises) won only two seats in the February 2005 parliamentary elections, the process of EGAT's privatisation was restarted. The agency was corporatized in June 2005, transforming it from the Electricity Generating Authority of Thailand to EGAT PLC.  However, EGAT's privatisation was abruptly delayed when some NGOs and some union members filed a petition with the Supreme Court a few days before the scheduled listing on the Stock Exchange of Thailand (SET).

On 23 March 2006, the Supreme Administrative Court ruled against the privatisation of EGAT PLC, citing conflicts of interest, public hearing irregularities, and the continued right of expropriation.  The court said that Olarn Chaipravat, a board member of PTT and Shin Corporation (both business partners of EGAT), was on a committee involved in the legal preparation of Egat's privatisation. The court questioned the neutrality of Parinya Nutalai, chair of the public hearing panel on the EGAT listing, because he was Vice Minister of Natural Resources and the Environment.

It also ruled that insufficient opportunities were given to EGAT employees to make themselves heard. There was only one public hearing for employees, which only 1,057 attended. Lastly, EGAT PLC continued to have the right to expropriate public land to build power plants and transmission lines, a right reserved for the state. Two decrees were nullified: one ordering the dissolution of the status of EGAT as a state enterprise, and the other serving as a new charter for EGAT PLC.

Union leaders and anti-Thaksin protesters cheered the ruling, and called for the denationalisation of other privatised state enterprises, such as PTT Exploration and Production (PTTEP) and Thai Airways International (both privatized in 1992), PTT PCL, TOT PCL, MCOT PCL, Thailand Post Co Ltd, and CAT Telecom PCL.  Like EGAT, PTT also retained land expropriation rights after it was privatised. However, this was one of the grounds for the nullification of the EGAT privatisation. Caretaker Finance Minister Thanong Bidaya has noted that the delisting and denationalisation of PTT could force the government to borrow massively from foreign institutions.

Some criticised that the listing of PTT on the SET on the grounds that it represented a massive transfer of public assets for the benefit of few people. Though the government initially accepted over 100,000 first-time investors, there were reports that the majority of the shares for sale to retail investors had been reserved for politicians, the banks' preferred clients, and journalists, leaving many retail investors, who stood in long lines to wait, to return home empty-handed. A nephew of Suriya Juengrungruangkit, the minister of Industry overseeing PTT and TRT Party secretary general, for example, was reported to have acquired 22 times the maximum number of PTT shares distributed to retail investors.

Fears of this being repeated were often cited as the reason why EGAT's privatisation was delayed indefinitely. Another key argument for delaying privatisation was that privatisation preceded the establishment of an independent energy regulatory authority. In international experience, there are no examples of successful monopoly utility privatisation without regulatory oversight. Under pressure, Thaksin's government formed an interim electricity regulatory body, but some charged that it lacked authority to force compliance, levy fines, or punish defaulters. EGAT employee concerns about employment security were also common. Some expressed concern that partial ownership of Thailand's largest electricity producer by foreign shareholders would impact national security and cause conflicts of interest.

Anti-privatisation petitioners (including the Confederation of Consumer Organisations, People Living with HIV/Aids, Alternative Energy Project for Sustainability, Free Trade Area Watch, and the Four Region Slum Network) were harshly criticised by both Thai and international investors, who accused them of using corrupt tactics in delaying the listing. They also pointed to the public mandate of the 2005 election, during which the only anti-privatisation party suffered a near complete loss. International power sector governance experts from Harvard University, University of Delaware, and the World Resources Institute lauded the successful repeal of EGAT privatisation as an important step towards increased accountability and transparency in the Thai energy industry.

Thailand's Power Development Plan, 2015-2036
According to Thailand's Power Development Plan for 2015-2036, the country intends to build 20 additional gas-powered electrical generating stations (17,728 MWe), nine "clean coal" power stations (7,390 MWe), and 14,206 MW of renewable energy, including hydro, a large proportion of which will be imported from Laos or Myanmar. Up to two nuclear plants are also in the plans.

Critics charge that power needs are overstated. Thailand plans for a reserve margin—the amount of energy available over that used at peak demand—of 15%. However, the plan identifies reserve margins as high as 39% in some years. The root cause is that Thailand regularly overestimates its economic growth, assuming it to be over four percent when it is historically around three percent.

The role of imported hydro is also at issue. In 2015, hydro accounted for approximately seven percent of Thailand's power output. Under the plan, it will rise to 15-20% by 2036, and additional hydro will be imported from the Xayaburi Dam in Laos on the Mekong River and from the Hat Gyi and Mong Ton dams in Myanmar. While these sources may look clean on Thailand's balance sheets, the devastating environmental impacts to locals are simply outsourced.

Many have asked why Thailand pursues a few very large coal power plants when it could be adopting safer, possibly cheaper routes, such as biomass reactors, like the 40 MWe plant operated by Double A in Prachinburi using wood and offcuts. The answer may lie in the fact that large, centralised mega-projects benefit the centralised system of project approval. With a public sector corruption rate of 25%, according to the Thai Chamber of Commerce, they can be very beneficial for unscrupulous officials. One reason, however, is the required base load of electricity.

See also
 Economy of Thailand#Energy
 Nuclear power in Thailand
Electricity Generating Authority of Thailand
Metropolitan Electricity Authority
Provincial Electricity Authority

References

External links 
Electricity Generating Authority of Thailand (EGAT)
Energy Policy and Planning Office (EPPO)
National Energy Policy Office (NEPO)
Google Earth Map of the oil and gas infrastructure in Thailand
 Thailand Electricity Security Assessment, 2016